User behavior analytics (UBA) is a cybersecurity process regarding the detection of insider threats, targeted attacks, and financial fraud that tracks a system's users. UBA looks at patterns of human behavior, and then analyzes observations to detect anomalies that may indicate potential threats.

Purpose 
The purpose of UBA, according to Johna Till Johnson of Nemertes Research, is that "Security systems provide so much information that it's tough to uncover information that truly indicates a potential for a real attack. Analytics tools help make sense of the vast amount of data that SIEM, IDS/IPS, system logs, and other tools gather. UBA tools use a specialized type of security analytics that focuses on the behavior of systems and the people using them. UBA technology first evolved in the field of marketing, to help companies understand and predict consumer-buying patterns. But as it turns out, UBA can be extraordinarily useful in the security context too."

See also
 Behavioral analytics
 Network behavior anomaly detection
 User activity monitoring

References

External links

ABC's Of UBA

Software